Lars Artur Tommy Andersson (born 19 November 1962 in Norrköping, died 15 October 2013) was a Swedish actor.

Selected filmography
2010 - Himlen är oskyldigt blå
2008 - Oskyldigt dömd (TV)
2007 - Se upp för dårarna
2007 - Wallander – Pyramiden
2006 - Van Veeteren – Moreno och tystnaden
2005 - Saltön (TV)
2004 - Strandvaskaren
2004 - Lilla Jönssonligan på kollo
2003 - En utflykt till månens baksida
2002 - Beck – Annonsmannen
2000 - Jalla! Jalla!
2000 - Livet är en schlager
2000 - Rederiet (TV)
1998 - Zingo
1995 - Naken

References

External links
 
 

Swedish male film actors
2013 deaths
1962 births
Swedish male television actors
20th-century Swedish male actors
21st-century Swedish male actors
People from Norrköping